A quill drive is a mechanism that allows a drive shaft to shift its position (either axially, radially, or both) relative to its driving shaft.  It consists of a hollow driving shaft (the quill) with a driven shaft inside it.  The two are connected in some fashion which permits the required motion.

Examples

Drill press
One example of a quill drive is found in a drill press where the quill allows the chuck to move vertically while being driven rotationally.

Railroad locomotive
Quill drives have been extensively used in railroad electric locomotives to connect between frame-mounted traction motors and the driven wheels.  The two are linked by a flexible drive which allows a degree of radial motion and possibly a small amount of axial motion. This allows the motors to be mounted on top of the suspension system, moving independently of the wheels. This smooths the drive from the motors and isolates them from mechanical shock. This also decreases the unsprung weight borne directly by the wheels, thus decreasing wear on the track.

Quill drives were used by many electric locomotives in the United States, particularly those of the Pennsylvania Railroad—their long-lasting GG1 design being perhaps the best known.  Many locomotives built in France, Germany, Italy and Poland used quill drives as well, allowing higher locomotive speed. The English Electric–built NZR ED class used a quill drive, but was found to be hard on the track.

See also
 Buchli drive
 Radial axle
 Tschanz drive
 Winterthur Universal Drive

References

Mechanisms (engineering)
Automotive technologies
Electric locomotives
Locomotive parts
Shaft drives